James Ronald Gordon Copeland , known professionally as James Cosmo (b. 1947), is a Scottish film and television actor known for his appearances in films including Highlander, Braveheart, Trainspotting,  Jagame Thandhiram, Troy, The Chronicles of Narnia: The Lion, the Witch and the Wardrobe, Ben-Hur and Wonder Woman, as well as television series such as Game of Thrones, Sons of Anarchy, His Dark Materials and Jack Ryan. He appeared in the nineteenth series of Celebrity Big Brother, finishing in fourth place.

Early life
Cosmo is the son of actor James Copeland and Helen Goodlet Findlay. He attended Hartfield Primary School in Dumbarton. Through his father, young James played cricket on Hampstead Heath with Sean Connery while his father was in the pub with Peter O'Toole.  He also has a sister named Laura. When he was 11, he moved back to Glasgow and later he worked for a time at Arnott Young shipbreakers in Dalmuir.

Career
At the start of his career he adopted Cosmo, the middle name of his mother Helen, as his stage surname.   Cosmo is best known for his film roles as Angus MacLeod in Highlander, Campbell in Braveheart and as Father Christmas in the adaptation of The Chronicles of Narnia: The Lion, the Witch and the Wardrobe. Over the years he has also had roles in other films such as Trainspotting, The Last Legion and 2081. He appeared in Troy with future Game of Thrones cast members Sean Bean and Julian Glover. He also appeared in UFO as SHADO operative Lieutenant Anderson, in Take the High Road as Alex Geddes from 1982 until 1983 and in 1984 played Jock McLeish in the Minder episode Senior Citizen Caine. He appeared as Lieutenant-Colonel Philip Drysdale in the seventh series of Soldier Soldier.  He portrayed Jeor Mormont, Lord Commander of the Night's Watch, in the HBO series Game of Thrones. He was involved in the filming of the thriller Breakdown in which he appeared alongside Craig Fairbrass, Bruce Payne, Emmett Scanlan, Olivia Grant and Tamer Hassan. He played the antagonist in the Indian film, Jagame Thandhiram, which released in 2021. He played a Russian intelligence officer named Luka Gocharov in season 3 of the Amazon show Jack Ryan. 

He is a patron of the charity Chance for Childhood.

Filmography

Film

Television

References

External links

Official Website 

20th-century births
Living people
Scottish male film actors
Scottish male television actors
Scottish male voice actors
People from Clydebank
20th-century Scottish male actors
21st-century Scottish male actors
Members of the Order of the British Empire
Year of birth missing (living people)